The women's 10,000 metres event at the 2017 Summer Universiade was held on 23 August at the Taipei Municipal Stadium.

Results

References

10000
2017